Krishna Pal Singh Yadav (born 15 January 1976) is an Indian politician and a Member of Parliament from Guna in Madhya Pradesh. He defeated Jyotiraditya Scindia from INC during 2019 Lok Sabha election. Yadav had even worked as Scindia's Member of Parliament-representative before he parted ways with him ahead of the 2018 assembly polls due to a dispute about him being denied a assembly ticket from Mungaoli.

Early life
Yadav was born to Raghuveer Singh. He completed his Bachelor of Ayurveda, Medicine and Surgery degree from Bhau Mulak Ayurvedic University, Nagpur in 2000-2001. He is an Ayurvedic practitioner.

References

External links
Website

1976 births
Living people
Bharatiya Janata Party politicians from Madhya Pradesh
India MPs 2019–present